Adrienne Pauly (born 30 May 1977) is a French actress and pop-rock singer.

She joined the Conservatoire National Superieur d'Art Dramatique in 1996, where she studied drama, and acted in films until 2002, when she discovered the piano through Camille Bazbaz. Later, she recorded a demo and, in 2004, made her first concert at the House of Live in Paris, and then to Dejazey in Rennes and thereafter at the Lavoir Moderne and at the Olympic Café. She released her first album on 16 October 2006.

Filmography

Film
 1997: Mauvais genre by Laurent Bénégui
 1997: Il y a des journées qui mériteraient qu'on leur casse la gueule by Alan Beigel
 1998: Terminale by Francis Girod
 1999: Au cœur du mensonge by Claude Chabrol
 2002: La Bête de miséricorde by Jean-Pierre Mocky
 2009: Bellamy by Claude Chabrol

Television
 2001: Le Prix de la vérité de Joël Santoni
 2011: Mystère au Moulin-Rouge in the role of Lila

Discography

Albums
 2006: Adrienne Pauly (first album)

Singles
 2006: "J'veux un mec"
 2006: "Nazebroke" ("La fille au Prisunic")

Nominations
 2007: Victoires de la Musique: "Artist Discovery of the Year"
 2007: Victoires de la Musique: "Album Discovery of the Year"

External links

 Adrienne Pauly on the Internet Movie Database

1977 births
Living people
People from Clamart
French film actresses
French National Academy of Dramatic Arts alumni
20th-century French actresses
21st-century French actresses
21st-century French singers
21st-century French women singers